Deltopectoral may refer to;

 Clavipectoral triangle, also known as the deltopectoral triangle
 Deltopectoral groove
 Deltopectoral lymph nodes